Stonethwaite is a small village in the Lake District in the English county of Cumbria, historically part of Cumberland, it is situated in the valley of the Stonethwaite Beck, a side valley of Borrowdale, and within the Lake District National Park. It is on the Cumbria Way long-distance footpath.

History
The farm at Stonethwaite was once owned by the monks at Fountains Abbey in Yorkshire from 1195 as part of lands they owned in the Borrowdale valley. The monks of Furness complained to King Edward II that they objected to the terms of the ownership of what was now a thriving dairy business. The king did not adjudicate but merely sequestrated the farm and then sold it back to Fountains Abbey in 1304 for two pounds.

Governance
Stonethwaite is within the Copeland UK Parliamentary constituency and the North West England European Parliamentary constituency. Trudy Harrison is the Member of parliament.

Before Brexit for the European Parliament its residents voted to elect MEP's for the North West England constituency.

For Local Government purposes it is in the Keswick Ward of Allerdale Borough Council and the Keswick Division of Cumbria County Council.

Stonethwaite has its own Parish Council; Borrowdale Parish Council.

See also

Listed buildings in Borrowdale

References

External links 

Stonethwaite webcam
Stonethwaite - the Cumbria Directory

Villages in Cumbria
Allerdale